Dale City is a  census-designated place (CDP) in Prince William County, Virginia, United States, located 25 miles south west of Washington, D.C. It is an annex of Woodbridge, Virginia. As of 2020, the total population was 72,088.

The community is roughly bounded by Hoadly Road to the northwest, Prince William Parkway to the north, Smoketown Road to the northeast, Gideon Drive to the east, and Cardinal Drive to the south.

History 

Dale City was the idea of a real estate developer, Cecil Don Hylton, who chose the term because it aptly describes the "hills and dales" of the rolling Virginia Piedmont, where he developed the community. Hylton began his career as a "huckster", a young man who sold farm goods and produce at the farmers' market in Washington, DC. He later began a sod business after several requests from his regular clients. He ran several dozen trucks and pioneered new technologies in the industry. After the post-war housing boom, he moved into homebuilding. Throughout his career, he constructed apartments, commercial shopping centers, and over 22,000 homes. Along the way, he began his own sewer company, Dale Service Company, as well as the first cable television companies in Prince William County.

His company, Hylton Enterprises, began Dale City in 1960 approximately 1 mile east of Interstate 95 and continued to build west towards Hoadly Road (State Route 642). By 1969, the first six communities were completed.  Many more were added in the 1970s and 1980s.

Several places in Dale City are named after Hylton, such as C.D. Hylton High School and the Hylton Memorial Chapel. More recently, the Hylton Foundation underwrote a major new addition to Potomac Hospital in nearby Woodbridge.  Hylton's companies have branched into new markets, especially real estate of existing houses.  Hylton Realty now sells property in and near Dale City. Hylton Enterprises manages commercial properties still controlled by the Hylton family, including several shopping centers, as well as several oddly-shaped parcels of unimproved land. These parcels were land that could not be built on or were proffered to the county; Andrew Leitch Park is one such parcel that has been given to the local Park Authority.

Because Dale City was built before most of eastern Prince William County was developed, it has its own water and sewer systems, separate from the ones in Occoquan, Woodbridge, Dumfries, Triangle, and Lake Ridge. Water service is provided by Virginia-American Water Company, and since 2013, Virginia-American also provides sewer service to Dale City through their purchase of the Dale Service Corporation.

Russell House and Store is a historic early 19th century building, located on Minnieville Road.

Communities
Each of the communities (often referred to as neighborhoods) ends in 'dale'. The streets along Dale Boulevard (generally) proceed alphabetically when followed from east to west starting from Gideon Blvd. and ending at Hoadly Rd.: Ashdale, Barksdale, Birchdale, Cherrydale, Cloverdale, Darbydale, Emberdale, Evansdale, Forestdale, Glendale, Hillendale, Kerrydale, Kirkdale, Lindendale (which includes Surrydale Ct.), Mapledale, Nottingdale, Orangedale, Princedale, Queensdale, Ridgedale, Silverdale, and Trentdale.  Most street names in each neighborhood begin with the first letter of the neighborhood.

Attractions and culture
Dale City is near Potomac Mills Mall, the second largest shopping mall in Northern Virginia, and the largest outlet mall in the United States.

Across from the Nottingdale and next to the Mapledale communities is Andrew Leitch Park, which includes a water park.

Geography
Dale City is located at  (38.648284, −77.342350).

According to the United States Census Bureau, the CDP has a total area of 15.0 square miles (39.0 km2), all of it land.

Demographics

As of the 2010 census, the racial breakdown was as follows:
 35.1% White
 28.8% Black
 7.9% Asian
 0.7% Native American or Native Alaskan
 0.2% Native Hawaiian or Other Pacific Islander
 27.2% Hispanic (10.7% Salvadoran, 3.6% Mexican, 2.3% Puerto Rican, 1.4% Honduran, 1.3% Guatemalan, 1.2% Peruvian, 1.0% Bolivian)

According to the U.S. census American Community Survey of 2006, there were 63,616 people, 20,866 households, and 17,072 families residing in the CDP. The population density was 4,241.1 people per square mile (1,631.2/km2). There were 22,054 housing units at an average density of 1,470.3/sq mi (535/km2). The racial makeup of the CDP was 43.4% White, 21.06% African American, 0.2% Native American, 11.22% Asian, 0.45% Pacific Islander, 19.12% from other races, and 4.55% from two or more races. Hispanic or Latino of any race were 29.28% of the population.  In addition, 31.3% of Dale City's population is foreign born.

There were 20,866 households, out of which 47.8% had children under the age of 18 living with them, 58.7% were married couples living together, 16.3% had a female householder with no husband present, and 18.2% were non-families. 13.6% of all households were made up of individuals, and 1.7% had someone living alone who was 65 years of age or older. The average household size was 3.05 and the average family size was 3.23.

In the CDP, the population was spread out, with 29.1% under the age of 18 and 4.1% who were 65 years of age or older. The median age was 31 years. For every 100 females, there were 99.3 males. For every 100 females age 18 and over, there were 97.6 males.

The median income for a household in the CDP was $71,179, and the median income for a family was $72,021 (these figures had risen to $79,075 and $80,382 respectively as of a 2007 estimate). Males had a median income of $50,920 versus $43,389 for females. The per capita income for the CDP was $26,864. About 3.3% of families and 4.8% of the population were below the poverty line, including 5.2% of those under age 18 and 17.6% of those age 65 or over.

Economy
The Consulate-General of El Salvador in Woodbridge is located at 14572 Potomac Mills Road in the Dale City CDP.

References
https://web.archive.org/web/20080511225416/http://www.pwcparks.org/Recreation/WaterWorksWaterpark/Features/tabid/187/Default.aspx

External links

 Centerpoint Church Dale City Virginia
 Prince William County Government
 Dale City Volunteer Fire Department

Census-designated places in Prince William County, Virginia